The canton of Le Mont-Blanc is an administrative division of the Haute-Savoie department, southeastern France. It was created at the French canton reorganisation which came into effect in March 2015. Its seat is in Passy.

It consists of the following communes:
Chamonix-Mont-Blanc
Les Contamines-Montjoie
Les Houches
Passy
Saint-Gervais-les-Bains
Servoz
Vallorcine

References

Cantons of Haute-Savoie